CDH3 may refer to:
 Cadherin 3, a human gene
 Finlay Air Park